The 2006–07 FA Cup (known as The FA Cup sponsored by E.ON for sponsorship reasons) was the 126th staging of the world's oldest football knockout competition; the FA Cup. This season's edition was the first to be sponsored by E.ON.

The competition started on 18 August 2006 with the first of the record number of 687 teams entering in the Extra Preliminary Round and concluded on 19 May 2007 with the Final, held at the new Wembley Stadium.

For information on the matches played from the Extra Preliminary Round to the final Qualifying Round, see FA Cup 2006-07 Qualifying Rounds.

Chelsea claimed this season's FA Cup with a hard-fought 1–0 victory over Manchester United, with Didier Drogba scoring the winning goal in the dying minutes of extra-time. Manchester United had played against top-flight opponents in each round, as they had when they won the Cup in 1948.

This was the last FA Cup (to date) at which the semi-finals were played at neutral club venues; since 2008 all FA Cup semi-finals have been played at Wembley Stadium.

Calendar

The results below detail the results from the First Round Proper onwards.

First round proper

Matches played on weekend of Saturday, 11 November 2006. The draw was made by Will Greenwood and Neil Back, adjudicated by Trevor Brooking.

Second round proper
Matches played on weekend of Saturday, 2 December 2006. The draw was made on 12 November by Graham Gooch and Mike Gatting, adjudicated by Trevor Brooking, and televised live on BBC One.

As mentioned below, Bury defeated Chester City 3–1 at the Deva Stadium but it was soon revealed that Bury had fielded an ineligible player, resulting in them being expelled from the competition and Chester City being reinstated.

Third round proper
This round marks the entry of the top-flight teams to the competition. Matches were played on the weekend of Saturday, 6 January 2007. The draw was made on 3 December 2006 by Amir Khan and Ricky Hatton, adjudicated by Trevor Brooking, and televised live on BBC One. Replays were held in the week of 16 and 17 January, with the exception of the Luton – QPR replay, which was postponed due to a waterlogged pitch.

Fourth round proper
Matches played on weekend of Saturday, 27 January 2007. The draw was made on 8 January by Hope Powell and Faye White, adjudicated by Trevor Brooking, and televised live on BBC Two and Sky Sports News.

Fifth round proper
Matches played on the weekend of Saturday, 17 February 2007. The draw took place on Monday, 29 January 2007 and was made by Darren Campbell and Roger Black, adjudicated by Trevor Brooking, and televised live on BBC Two and Sky Sports News.

Sixth round proper
Matches played on the weekend of Saturday, 10 March 2007. The draw for the round, also known as the quarter-finals, took place on Monday, 19 February 2007 at 1:30pm GMT. The draw was made by Steve McClaren and Terry Venables, adjudicated by Trevor Brooking and televised live on BBC Two. This was the last round in which matches were held on the home grounds of one of the teams. The only non-Premier League team to reach the quarter-finals this season were Plymouth Argyle.

Replays

Semi-finals

Unlike earlier rounds, matches were played on neutral grounds on the weekend of Saturday, 14 April 2007. There would be no replays even if the matches were drawn; instead, extra time would decide winners immediately thereafter. Only if extra time did not decide the winners, a penalty shootout would decide winners. The draw for the semi-finals took place on Monday, 12 March 2007 at 1:30pm GMT. The draw was made by Ray Clemence, and adjudicated by Trevor Brooking.

Final
 

The 126th FA Cup Final was played at the new Wembley Stadium and it was the first FA Cup Final to be played in London since 2000. Similarly to the semi-finals, there would be no replay even if the match was drawn; instead, extra time would be used to decide the winners. If extra time failed to separate the two sides, the match would go to penalties. Chelsea's victory ended Manchester United's hopes of becoming the only English club to win the double four times (having previously won it in 1994, 1996 and 1999), and in doing so, completed their own cup-double.

Assistant Referees:
Peter Kirkup (Northamptonshire)
Dave Bryan (Lincolnshire)
Fourth official: Howard Webb (Sheffield & Hallamshire)

Top scorers

Player of the Round

Media coverage
In the United Kingdom, the BBC were the free to air broadcasters for the six consecutive season while Sky Sports were the subscription broadcasters for the nineteenth consecutive season.

References

 
FA Cup seasons
FA Cup